Michal Mravec (born 10 June 1987 in Žilina) is a professional Slovak football midfielder who plays for SK Gbeľany.

Career
Born in Žilina. He started his career by playing in the youth teams of MŠK Žilina, where he won numerous tournaments including competitions in the Netherlands, Italy and all over Europe. 

Mravec was named the best juggler and the most technical player in the country at the U14 level. Later his career continued in the United States, where he joined Redwings Soccer Club based out of Atlanta.

At the age of 19, he accepted an offer for a full athletic scholarship from University of Alabama at Birmingham Men's Soccer Team and joined the Blazers. During his UAB career, Mravec earned a multiple C-USA All-Conference accolades.

In 2011, Mravec was drafted by MLS Sporting Kansas City. In July 2011, he joined Dutch club FC Emmen on a two-year contract. He made his debut for FC Emmen against FC Eindhoven on 5 August 2011.

On 4 February 2013, he signed two and half year contract with MŠK Žilina. 

On 25 July 2013, Mravec made his first team debut against NK Olimpija Ljubljana in the 2013–14 UEFA Europa League.

In February 2014, Mravec signed a 6-month deal with Podbeskidzie of Polish Extraklasa. 

In March 2015, Mravec signed a contract with the Atlanta Silverbacks of the North American Soccer League.

In March 2016, Mravec signed a contract with RoPS of Finnish Veikkausliiga. In June and July 2016, Mravec played for RoPS in the 2016-2017 UEFA Europa League against Shamrock Rovers and Lokomotiva Zagreb.

Personal life
Born in Žilina, Slovakia. Mravec spent several years in the United States.

Mravec holds a bachelor's degree from University of Alabama at Birmingham and an MBA degree from City University of Seattle.

References

External links
UAB Sports profile
Info Sportinc profile

Michal Mravec at Futbalnet

1987 births
Living people
Slovak footballers
Slovak expatriate footballers
Association football midfielders
UAB Blazers men's soccer players
FC Emmen players
MŠK Žilina players
Podbeskidzie Bielsko-Biała players
Atlanta Silverbacks players
Rovaniemen Palloseura players
Kokkolan Palloveikot players
FK Frýdek-Místek players
FK Fotbal Třinec players
Eerste Divisie players
North American Soccer League players
Veikkausliiga players
Kakkonen players
Ykkönen players
Slovak Super Liga players
Czech National Football League players
Slovak expatriate sportspeople in the Netherlands
Slovak expatriate sportspeople in Poland
Slovak expatriate sportspeople in the United States
Slovak expatriate sportspeople in Finland
Slovak expatriate sportspeople in the Czech Republic
Expatriate footballers in the Netherlands
Expatriate footballers in Poland
Expatriate soccer players in the United States
Expatriate footballers in Finland
Expatriate footballers in the Czech Republic
Sportspeople from Žilina
Sporting Kansas City draft picks
City University of Seattle alumni